Solar cycle 6 was the sixth solar cycle since 1755, when extensive recording of solar sunspot activity began. The solar cycle lasted 12.8 years, beginning in August 1810 and ending in May 1823 (thus falling within the Dalton Minimum).  The maximum smoothed sunspot number observed during the solar cycle was 81.2, in May 1816 (the lowest of any cycle to date, as a result of being part of the Dalton Minimum), and the starting minimum was 0.0.

See also
List of solar cycles

References

Solar cycles